Four County Career Center is a public vocational school located in Ridgeville Township, Henry County, Ohio, south of Archbold.  The school derives its name from the fact that it primarily serves students from school districts in the four Ohio counties of Defiance, Fulton, Henry, and Williams.

Partner schools 
source

Archbold High School
Ayersville High School
Bryan High School
Defiance High School
Delta High School
Edgerton High School
Edon High School
Evergreen High School
Fairview High School
Fayette High School
Hicksville High School
Hilltop High School
Holgate High School
Liberty Center High School
Montpelier High School
Napoleon High School
North Central High School
Patrick Henry High School
Pettisville High School
Stryker High School
Tinora High School
Wauseon High School

History 
Four County began in May 1966 when the career center district was formed.  It first opened its doors in September 1969 to 900 juniors and seniors in a building that cost $5,000,000.  Four County was also the first vocational school in Ohio to be built with local funding.  With updated modifications, the original five acre building has graduated over 22,000 students since it opened.

Notes

Vocational schools in Ohio